The 1978 Wimbledon Championships was a tennis tournament that took place on the outdoor grass courts at the All England Lawn Tennis and Croquet Club in Wimbledon, London, United Kingdom. The tournament ran from 26 June until 8 July. It was the 92nd staging of the Wimbledon Championships, and the second Grand Slam tennis event of 1978.

Prize money
The total prize money for 1978 championships was £279,023. The winner of the men's title earned £19,000 while the women's singles champion earned £17,100.

* per team

Champions

Seniors

Men's singles

 Björn Borg defeated  Jimmy Connors, 6–2, 6–2, 6–3

Women's singles

 Martina Navratilova defeated  Chris Evert, 2–6, 6–4, 7–5
It was Navratilova's 1st Grand Slam singles title.

Men's doubles

 Bob Hewitt /  Frew McMillan defeated  John McEnroe /  Peter Fleming, 6–1, 6–4, 6–2

Women's doubles

 Kerry Reid /  Wendy Turnbull defeated  Mima Jaušovec /  Virginia Ruzici, 4–6, 9–8(12–10), 6–3

Mixed doubles

 Frew McMillan /  Betty Stöve defeated  Ray Ruffels /  Billie Jean King, 6–2, 6–2

Juniors

Boys' singles

 Ivan Lendl defeated   Jeff Turpin, 6–3, 6–4

Girls' singles

 Tracy Austin defeated  Hana Mandlíková, 6–0, 3–6, 6–4

Singles seeds

Men's singles
  Björn Borg (champion)
  Jimmy Connors (final, lost to Björn Borg)
  Vitas Gerulaitis (semifinals, lost to Jimmy Connors)
  Guillermo Vilas (third round, lost to Tom Okker)
  Brian Gottfried (quarterfinals, lost to Vitas Gerulaitis)
  Roscoe Tanner (fourth round, lost to Ilie Năstase)
  Raúl Ramírez (quarterfinals, lost to Jimmy Connors)
  Sandy Mayer (quarterfinals, lost to Björn Borg)
  Ilie Năstase (quarterfinals, lost to Tom Okker)
  Dick Stockton (first round, lost to John Marks)
  John McEnroe (first round, lost to Erik van Dillen)
  Buster Mottram (second round, lost to Frew McMillan)
  Wojciech Fibak (fourth round, lost to Sandy Mayer)
  John Alexander (fourth round, lost to Jimmy Connors)
  Arthur Ashe (first round, lost to Steve Docherty)
  John Newcombe (fourth round, lost to Raúl Ramírez)

Women's singles
  Chris Evert (final, lost to Martina Navratilova)
  Martina Navratilova (champion)
  Evonne Goolagong Cawley (semifinals, lost to Martina Navratilova)
  Virginia Wade (semifinals, lost to Chris Evert)
  Billie Jean King (quarterfinals, lost to Chris Evert)
  Betty Stöve (fourth round, lost to Virginia Ruzici)
  Wendy Turnbull (fourth round, lost to Mima Jaušovec)
  Dianne Fromholtz (fourth round, lost to Marise Kruger)
  Tracy Austin (fourth round, lost to Martina Navratilova)
  Kerry Reid (fourth round, lost to Chris Evert)
  Marise Kruger (quarterfinals, lost to Martina Navratilova)
  Mima Jaušovec (quarterfinals, lost to Virginia Wade)
  Virginia Ruzici (quarterfinals, lost to Evonne Goolagong Cawley)
  Sue Barker (fourth round, lost to Billie Jean King)
  Regina Maršíková (fourth round, lost to Evonne Goolagong Cawley)
  Marita Redondo (third round, lost to Ruta Gerulaitis)

References

External links
 Official Wimbledon Championships website

 
Wimbledon Championships
Wimbledon Championships
Wimbledon Championships
Wimbledon Championships